The 2012–13 Cupa României was the seventy-fifth season of the annual Romanian football knockout tournament. The winner of the competition qualifies for the second qualifying round of the 2013–14 UEFA Europa League, if they have not already qualified for European competition; if so then the first non-European place of the 2012–13 Liga I qualifies for the first qualifying round of the 2013–14 UEFA Europa League.

Round of 32 
The 14 winners of the fifth round are joined in this round by the 18 teams from the 2012–13 Liga I. The ties were played on 25–27 September 2012.

Round of 16 

The draw for the Round of 16 took place on 3 October 2012. The draw featured the 16 winners of the Round of 32. The matches were played from 30 October to 1 November 2012

Quarter-finals 

The draw for the quarter-finals, semi-finals and final (to determine the "home" team) took place on 6 November 2012. The draw featured the 8 winners from the previous round, all from Liga I. The matches will be played on 27–29 November 2012.

Semi-finals

1st leg

2nd leg

Final

References

2012–13 in Romanian football
2012–13 domestic association football cups
2012-13